(418 – 8 September 479) was the 21st legendary Emperor of Japan, according to the traditional order of succession. He is remembered as a patron of sericulture.

No firm dates can be assigned to this Emperor's life or reign, but he is conventionally considered to have reigned from 25 December 456 to 8 September 479.

Legendary narrative
Yūryaku was a 5th-century monarch. The reign of Emperor Kinmei ( – 571 AD), the 29th  Emperor, is the first for which contemporary historiography is able to assign verifiable dates; however, the conventionally accepted names and dates of the early Emperors were not to be confirmed as "traditional" until the reign of Emperor Kanmu (737–806), the 50th sovereign of the Yamato dynasty.

According to the Kojiki, this Emperor is said to have ruled from the Thirteenth Day of the Eleventh Month of 456 (Heishin) until his death on the Seventh Day of the Eight Month of 479 (Kibi).

According to Kojiki and Nihon Shoki, Yūryaku was named  at birth, literally meaning "Wakatake (Young Warrior) of Great Hatsuse", where "Hatsuse" is the old name for Sakurai, Nara.  is a name posthumously assigned to him by a much later era, literally meaning "Magnificent Plan". He was the fifth and youngest son of Emperor Ingyō. After his elder brother Emperor Ankō was murdered, he won the struggle against his other brothers and became the new Emperor.

Yūryaku's contemporary title would not have been tennō, as most historians believe this title was not introduced until the reigns of Emperor Tenmu and Empress Jitō. Rather, it was presumably , meaning "the great king who rules all under heaven". He had three wives (including his consort Kusahahatahi). His successor, Prince Shiraka (Emperor Seinei), was his son by his wife Kazuraki no Karahime.

In 463, Yūryaku Tennō invited the thunder god of the Mimuro hill to come to the Imperial Palace, and ordered Chiisakobe no muraji Sugaru to fetch the deity. He obliged, thinking the supernatural being would have no reason to refuse the invitation, and rode carrying a halberd with a red banner, symbolising his office of royal messenger. Soon enough, the thunder stroke, and Sugaru enlisted the help of priests to enshrine the kami into a portable carriage, to be brought in the Emperor's presence, as a great serpent. But, said Emperor neglected to practice proper ritual purification and religious abstinence. The thunder kami then showed his displeasure through thundering and threatening fiery eyeballs, and Emperor Yūryaku fled into the interior of the Palace while covering his eyes. The great serpent was returned to Mimuro, and the Emperor made many offerings to appease the angry deity. This story is recorded in Nihongi and mentioned by William George Aston, in "Shinto, the Ancient Religion of Japan" as well as several other books.

According to the Nihongi, Yūryaku was of ungovernable and suspicious temperament, and committed many acts of arbitrary cruelty.

The actual site of Yūryaku's grave is not known. The Emperor is traditionally venerated at a memorial Shinto shrine (misasagi) in Habikino, Osaka, which is designated by the Imperial Household Agency as Yūryaku's mausoleum. It is formally named Tajihi no Takawashi-no-hara no misasagi.

Consorts and children

Empress (Kōgō) : , Emperor Nintoku's daughter

Consort (Hi) : , Katsuragi no Tsubura no Ōomi's daughter
Third Son: , later Emperor Seinei
, Saiō

Consort (Hi): , Kibi no Kamitsumichi no omi's daughter

Consort (Hi) : , Kasuga no Wani no omi Fukame's daughter
, married to Emperor Ninken

King Bu

According to the Book of Song, a King Bu (武) from Japan dispatched envoys to the Emperor of Liu Song, a Southern Chinese dynasty, in both 477 and 478. Communications included a notice that the previous ruler, an older brother, had died, and that Bu had ascended to the throne. The King 'Bu' in this document is believed to refer to Emperor Yūryaku, due to the fact that the character used to write the name (武) is found in the name by which Emperor Yūryaku was called during his lifetime: .

The inscriptions on the Inariyama and Eta Funayama Sword, also supports the idea that Bu is an equivalent of Emperor Yūryaku.

The Chinese historical records state that Bu began his rule before 477, was recognized as the ruler of Japan by the Liu Song, Southern Qi, and Liang dynasties, and continued his rule through to 502.

Poetry
The Emperor's interest in poetry is amongst the more well-documented aspects of his character and reign. Poems attributed to him are included in the Man'yōshū, and a number of his verses are preserved in the Kojiki and the Nihonshoki.

Ancestry

See also
 Emperor of Japan
 List of Emperors of Japan
 Eta Funayama Sword
 Five kings of Wa
 Imperial cult
 Inariyama Sword

Notes

References
 Aston, William George. (1896).  Nihongi: Chronicles of Japan from the Earliest Times to A.D. 697. London: Kegan Paul, Trench, Trubner. 
 Batten, Bruce Loyd. (2006).   Gateway to Japan: Hakata in war and peace, 500–1300. Honolulu:University of Hawaii Press. ; ;   OCLC	254764602]
 Brown, Delmer M. and Ichirō Ishida, eds. (1979).  Gukanshō: The Future and the Past. Berkeley: University of California Press. ; 
 Nippon Gakujutsu Shinkokai (1969). The Manyōshū: The Nippon Gakujutsu Shinkokai Translation of One Thousand Poems. New York: Columbia University Press. 
 Ponsonby-Fane, Richard Arthur Brabazon. (1959).  The Imperial House of Japan. Kyoto: Ponsonby Memorial Society. 
 Titsingh, Isaac. (1834). Nihon Ōdai Ichiran; ou,  Annales des empereurs du Japon.  Paris: Royal Asiatic Society, Oriental Translation Fund of Great Britain and Ireland. 
 Varley, H. Paul. (1980).  Jinnō Shōtōki: A Chronicle of Gods and Sovereigns. New York: Columbia University Press. ;

External links
Nihon Shoki Online English Translations. Scroll 14 - Emperor Yuryaku

 
 

Japanese emperors
418 births
479 deaths
People of Kofun-period Japan
5th-century monarchs in Asia
5th-century Japanese monarchs
Japanese male poets
Man'yō poets
5th-century Japanese poets